Holy Tears may refer to:
"Holy Tears", song by Isis from album In the Absence of Truth
"Holy Tears", song by Tara MacLean from album Silence